The X-Air Hanuman (English: Hawk) is a two-seat, fixed tricycle gear, general aviation ultralight airplane, manufactured in India by Raj Hamsa Ultralights. It is used primarily for flight training, touring, and personal flying. The aircraft is known in North America as the X-Air "H".

Design and development
The X-Air Hanuman is a single-engined high-wing monoplane with side-by-side seats for the pilot and a passenger. The aircraft is manufactured with an  four-cylinder four-stroke 2.2 litre Jabiru 2200 engine, which can be run on automotive fuel. The  Rotax 582 two-stroke, the  Rotax 912UL are also options.

The airframe is assembled from aluminum tubing, with steel reinforcement and is covered in Dacron sailcloth. More recent models feature composite winglets and doors.

The Hanuman offers full dual controls, with the exception of the main pilot seat having brakes and flap controls. Instrumentation consists of a tachometer, airspeed indicator, altimeter, slip indicator, battery charge indicator & coolant temperature or CHT, GPS etc.

The design is a Federal Aviation Administration approved special light-sport aircraft under the designation X-Air XA85.

Variants
X-AIR "H" Hanuman
Base model
X-Air LS XA-85
X-AIR Hawk
Version for the United Kingdom, certified as a microlight under Civil Aviation Authority BCAR Section S and provided in kit form.

Military operators

 Indian Military Academy - Basic flight training 
 Military Headquarters Of War

Specifications (Hanuman)

See also

Comparable aircraft 
 Best Off Skyranger
 ICP Savannah
 Ikarus C42
 Zenith CH-701

References

External links

Raj Hamsa's Indian website
Raj Hamsa's US website

2000s Indian civil utility aircraft
Light-sport aircraft